Peter Marralwanga (1916–1987), also known as Djakku (meaning left-handed), was a Aboriginal Australian artist known for his painting. He was a member of the Kardbam clan of the Bininj people, and spoke the Kuninjku language.

Born in 1916 in West Arnhem Land in the Northern Territory of Australia, Marralwanga derived influence from Yirawala, a fellow artist and elder from his community. He is best known for his creation of paintings both on paper and bark. These works reflect the artistic practices of his elders and community with elements of ceremonial and spiritual creatures alongside the cross-hatching pattern known as rarrk. He continued his legacy by teaching younger artists of his region like his son, Ivan Namirrki, and nephew, John Mawurndjul. He is regarded as an inspirational painter from the region.

Career 
Marralwanga began to paint relatively late during his mid 50s, starting around 1970. Under the guidance of Yirawala, Marralwanga began to incorporate ceremonial items in his works. His later style was influenced by Yirawala. Due to his age, he had gained permission from the clan to incorporate ceremonial elements and knowledge into the works of art . In Kuninjku art, much of the artistic content is sacred. The artists have strict guidelines on what they can depict in their works. Oftentimes artists who have special roles within a community receive exclusive rights to paint certain images. Marralwanga's use of rarrk also strayed from its original use for mortuary painting to ensure that traditional foods grow each season. He passed his knowledge of rarrk to a new generation of artists and served as an inspiration to their works.

While much of Marralwanga's work was derived from the ceremony, he still added elements from his own life and experience. Marralwanga described this interaction within his work between the ceremony and his personal experience saying his works were “half secret one, half ordinary one." Marralwanga's choice to explore his own experience as well as his deep ceremonial knowledge allowed him to create a diverse body of work which depicted many figures and ceremonies.

Works 
 Peter Marralwanga, Kuninjku people, Ngal-Kunburriyaymi 1982
 Ngalyod, the Rainbow Serpent, at Manabinbala, 1980-81
 Mimih Spirit Dancing at Catfish Ceremony, 1979
 Kangaroo with Headdress and Spirit Figures, c. 1980s

Exhibitions 
1981: Solo exhibition at Mary Macha at Aboriginal Traditional Arts
1983: Solo exhibition at Mary Macha at Aboriginal Traditional Arts
1989: A Myriad of Dreaming: Twentieth Century Aboriginal Art
1991: Aboriginal Art and Spirituality
2004: Crossing Country- the Alchemy of Western Arnhem Land Art

References 

1916 births
1987 deaths
20th-century Australian artists
Indigenous Australian artists
Artists from the Northern Territory